Potamotrygonocotyle chisholmae is a species of parasitic monogenean flatworms. The species was first described from gills of Potamotrygon stingray from Brazil.

References 

Fauna of Brazil
Animals described in 2007
Monopisthocotylea